The 2014–15 VMI Keydets basketball team represented the Virginia Military Institute in the 2014–15 NCAA Division I men's basketball season.  The Keydets were led by tenth-year head coach Duggar Baucom and played their home games out of Cameron Hall, their home since 1981. VMI rejoined the Southern Conference after an eleven-year absence, having been a member of the Big South from 2003 to 2014. VMI was a member of the SoCon from 1924 until 2003. They finished the season 11–19, 7–11 in SoCon play to finish in sixth place. They lost in the quarterfinals of the SoCon tournament to Mercer.

On March 28, head coach Duggar Baucom resigned to take the same position at The Citadel. He finished with a record of 151–159 in ten seasons.

Preseason

Departures
VMI graduated three seniors in 2014, including two of their top scorers, guard Rodney Glasgow and center D. J. Covington. Additionally, on October 29, 2014, head coach Duggar Baucom announced that brothers Ot and Jon Elmore would be withdrawing from the team as well as VMI. Ot was an academic sophomore who was redshirted in 2013–14 and did not appear in a game. Jon was a highly sought-after freshman. Their father, Gay Elmore, who once played at VMI and is currently second on the school's all-time point-scoring list, said in a statement to The Charleston Gazette that the brothers left the school because of a "personal family matter".

Later in the year, shortly following a 63–75 road loss to UNC Greensboro, it was announced that VMI guard and leading scorer QJ Peterson was placed on a medical furlough and would not be attending VMI for the remainder of the academic year. Peterson ended the season averaging 19.6 points per game, but did so on only 34% overall shooting and 27% from the three-point line.

Coaching changes
On May 22, 2014, it was announced that VMI hired Ben Thompson as an assistant coach to the program. Thompson came from UNC Pembroke as an assistant and part of a Brave team that made back-to-back winning seasons from 2011 to 2013, the first time in over twenty years the school had accomplished that feat. He is a 2006 graduate of Virginia Tech. Thompson replaced longtime VMI assistant Jason Allison, who had been with the team since Baucom began coaching in 2005. Allison departed for an assistant coaching job with Appalachian State.

Recruiting

Roster

Depth chart

Schedule

|-
!colspan=9 style="background:#FF0000; color:#FFFF00;"| Regular Season

|-
!colspan=9 style="background:#FF0000; color:#FFFF00;"| SoCon tournament

References

VMI Keydets basketball seasons
VMI
VMI Keydets bask
VMI Keydets bask